Norfolcioconcha is a genus of small air-breathing land snails, terrestrial pulmonate gastropod mollusks in the family Charopidae.

Species
Species within the genus Norfolcioconch include:
 Norfolcioconcha iota
 Norfolcioconcha norfolkensis

References

External links

Charopidae
Taxonomy articles created by Polbot